The Voievodeasa is a left tributary of the river Sucevița in Romania. It flows into the Sucevița in the village Voievodeasa.

References

Rivers of Romania
Rivers of Suceava County